Welcome to the Afterfuture is a studio album by the American hip hop musician Mike Ladd. It was released on Ozone Music in 2000.

Critical reception

Brian Whitener of AllMusic gave the album 4 out of 5 stars, writing, "Welcome to the Afterfuture is a blender of sounds and styles and epitomizes the search that is leading cutting-edge hip-hop further into avant-garde and non-Western musical traditions." Jon Caramanica of CMJ New Music Monthly commented that "Ladd's futurism is merely a mask for his very tangible discontent with the present." He added, "References to the police state permeate the album, arguing that the new world order and newspeak are more than just things weeded street-corner bards philosophize on; they're integral to maintaining the power status quo."

Legacy
The album was included in the book 1001 Albums You Must Hear Before You Die.

Track listing

Personnel
Credits adapted from liner notes.

 Mike Ladd – vocals, bass guitar (8), synthesizer, sampler, production, programming, mixing, executive production
 Bruce Grant – tape loop
 Fred Ones – turntables (1-4, 6-13), production (4), recording (1-4, 6, 8-13), mixing (1-4, 6, 8-13)
 Jun – vocal recording (1, 4)
 El-P – vocals (5)
 Bigg Jus – vocals (5)
 Mr. Len – turntables (5)
 Vassos – recording (5), mixing (5)
 Charles Calello – keyboards (7)
 Matt Stein – recording (7), mixing (7)
 Jeff Cordero – guitar (8)
 Eric M.O. – bass guitar (10)
 Ken Heitmuller – mastering
 Prashant – art direction, design, photography
 Mark Feggins – layout assistance
 Tony Duval – photography
 Amaechi Uzoigwe – executive production

References

External links
 

2000 albums
Mike Ladd albums